Ragna is a feminine given name. It may refer to:

 Ragna Ahlbäck (1914–2002) was a Finnish ethnographer and archivist
 Ragna Debats (born 1979), Dutch snowshoe runner, trail runner and sky runner
 Ragna Flotve (born 1960), Norwegian politician
 Ragna Grubb (1903–1961), Danish architect
 Ragna Hørbye (1861–1950), Norwegian politician
 Ragna Kjartansdóttir (born 1980), stage name Cell7, Icelandic rapper, songwriter and audio engineer
 Ragna Nikolasdatter (died 1161), queen consort of King Eystein II of Norway
 Ragna Patawary (born 1980), Faroese footballer
 Ragna Schirmer (born 1972), German classical pianist
 Ragna Sigurðardóttir (born 1962), Icelandic writer, translator and artist
 Ragna Wettergreen (1864–1958), Norwegian actress

See also
 Ragna Lóa Stefánsdóttir (born 1966), Icelandic former footballer 
 Ragna Margrét Brynjarsdóttir (born 1990), Icelandic basketball player

Feminine given names